The Sun Shine 38 is a French sailboat that was designed by Tony Castro as a cruiser-racer and first built in 1987.

The design is a development of the Sun Shine 36 with a longer and sharper transom, giving it a longer waterline length and thus higher hull speed.

Production
The design was built by Jeanneau in France, from 1987 to 1989, in both "team" and "owners" versions, but it is now out of production.

Design
The Sun Shine 38 is a recreational keelboat, built predominantly of fiberglass using Aramat K, which is a stratified glass/Kevlar composite material. It has a masthead sloop rig. The hull has a raked stem, a sharply reverse transom, an internally mounted spade-type rudder controlled by a wheel and a fixed fin keel or optional stub keel and retractable centerboard. The fin keel version displaces  and carries  of ballast, while the centerboard-equipped version displaces  and carries  of ballast.

The design has sleeping accommodation for six people, with a double "V"-berth in the bow cabin, an "L"-shaped settee and a straight settee in the main cabin and an aft cabin with a double berth on the port side. The galley is located on the port side just forward of the companionway ladder. The galley is "U"-shaped and is equipped with a two-burner stove, ice box and a double sink. A navigation station is opposite the galley, on the starboard side. The head is located just aft of the companionway on the starboard side. There is also a single sink located just aft of the bow cabin on the port side and inside the aft cabin.

For sailing downwind the design may be equipped with a symmetrical spinnaker.

Operational history
In a 2014 used boat review David Liscio wrote, "with a fast hull and strong rig, the lightweight Sunshine 38 is capable of efficiently capturing a gentle breeze or taking on a gusty blow. Just as Castro planned, it's the perfect combination of speed and comfort."

See also
List of sailing boat types

References

External links

Keelboats
1980s sailboat type designs
Sailing yachts
Sailboat type designs by Tony Castro
Sailboat types built by Jeanneau